Off the Ropes was a professional wrestling television program for Kiwi Pro Wrestling (KPW).  The show debuted on Prime TV in New Zealand on 15 November 2009.

Show history
In October 2009, KPW announced the launch of a flagship TV show on its website and that the show was to be named Off the Ropes.   Later that month, the commencement date and transmission time of the show were announced.

KPW management made the decision to name the show Off the Ropes so that the title format would be similar to Steve Rickard's famous New Zealand professional wrestling TV programme On The Mat, broadcast some 25 years earlier.

The show is significant in New Zealand professional wrestling history in that Off the Ropes is the first show featuring New Zealand professional wrestling show to be broadcast on a nationally available free-to-air television channel since On The Mat ceased transmission by South Pacific Pictures circa 1984.

Off the Ropes began transmission of its 13-episode first season on Sunday 15 November 2009.

Show format
The show aired every Sunday at 1:30 pm – 2:00pm on Prime Television New Zealand, a free-to air national television network.  Each episode was approximately 24 minutes in length (produced for a 30-minute time-slot) and featured usually two matches (two singles matches, or one singles match and one tag team match), wrestler interviews in the Backstage Pass segment hosted by KPW staff member Ilex Bell, and backstage vignettes that reveal more of the wrestlers' personality and motivations.

On-air performers

Champions

KPW Heavyweight Championship

KPW Tag Team Championship

Authority figures
 KPW CEO Rip Morgan
 KPW GM Terry the Golden Greek
 Mr Rumble

Referees
 Head Referee Daniel Martins
 Mark Freemantle

Commentators
 Blair the Flair
 The Wonderful Wilba Force

Recurring segments
Backstage Pass, host by Ilex Bell

Appearances in other media

Print and other media
Off the Ropes was previewed and promoted in the National Business Review on 25 September 2009,
the Otago Daily Times on 6 October 2009 and also on 13 October 2009, the New Zealand TV Guide on 5 November 2009, the Truth on 13 November 2009, the Herald on 14 November 2009 and also on and 25 September 2009, the New Zealand Listener on 14 November 2009, The Sunday Star-Times on 15 November 2009 and the Sunday News on 15 November 2009.

Off the Ropes was also promoted on the New Zealand website Throng on 25 September 2009 and on 15 November 2009.

Wrestlers' interviews
KPW mainstay H-Flame was also the subject of a cover story for the internationally distributed Fire & Rescue, the official New Zealand Fire service magazine, and was also featured in the Wanganui Chronicle on 6 November 2009, and the New Zealand Herald on 2 November 2009.

KPW wrestler the Technician was interviewed by the Waikato Times on 11 November 2009.

KPW wrestler Jade Diamond was interviewed by The Northern Advocate on 3 November 2009.

See also

List of professional wrestling television series

References

External links
 Facebook KPW fansite
 Kiwi Pro Wrestling official website
 

2009 New Zealand television series debuts
2010 New Zealand television series endings
New Zealand professional wrestling promotions
New Zealand professional wrestling television series
Prime (New Zealand TV channel) original programming